The Arshantan age is a period of geologic time (48.6–37.2 Ma) within the Early Eocene epoch of the Paleogene used more specifically with Asian Land Mammal Ages. It follows the Bumbanian age and precedes the Irdinmanhan age.

The upper boundary layer of the Arshantan can be the lower boundary of the Priabonian

Eocene